The Settlement is a 1999 film directed by Mark Steilen, starring John C. Reilly, William Fichtner, and Kelly McGillis. The film was screened at the Los Angeles Independent Film Festival in April 1999.

Plot summary
Pat (John C. Reilly) and Jerry (William Fichtner) work on the fringes of the insurance industry in what are called "viatical settlements," which allow terminal patients the option of cashing in their life insurance policies before death for a reduced payment. In the 1980s, with AIDS cutting short what might have been long and healthy lives, business is booming for Pat and Jerry's firm, Viable Settlements, Inc. But a few years later, improved treatments are keeping the terminally ill alive much longer – and that's bad news for Viable Settlements, which is now on the brink of bankruptcy. When Pat and Jerry meet the beautiful and mysterious Barbara (Kelly McGillis), no one's sure if she's good or bad news.

Cast
John C. Reilly as Pat
William Fichtner as Jerry
Kelly McGillis as Fake Barbara / Ellie
David Rasche as Denny
Dan Castellaneta as Neal

References

External links

1999 films
1999 comedy films
American comedy films
American independent films
CineTel Films films
Films scored by Brian Tyler
Films about fraud
Insurance fraud
Mafia comedy films
1999 directorial debut films
1990s English-language films
1990s American films